Milan Štrljić (born 22 March 1952) is a Croatian actor and theatre director. He appeared in more than ninety films since 1972.

Personal life
Štrljić has a daughter Iva, who is also an actress, with his Serbian former wife Slavica.

Selected filmography

Film roles

Television roles

References

External links 

1952 births
Living people
Croatian male film actors
Croatian theatre directors